Nathan Hoobler (born November 2, 1979) is an American writer, director, and producer for the Focus on the Family-created radio drama, Adventures in Odyssey. Nathan grew up listening to Adventures in Odyssey and even started his own fansite about the show before being hired by Focus on the Family. He has a degree in Media Communication from Asbury College. In addition to his other roles, Nathan produced the bonus features for The Gold Audio Series. and has authored 2 books for the series.

Career 
In 1999, Nathan started the AIOHQ website and in the summer of 2000, got the opportunity to work with the Adventures in Odyssey team for a few months. For about a year and a half, he worked for the show on a freelance basis and wrote about five scripts. He became a full-time staff writer for Odyssey in January 2002, and has since written over 70 scripts, and directed over 50 episodes.

Personal life 
Originally from Pennsylvania, Nathan now lives in Colorado Springs with his wife Tara and 2 sons.

Books by Nathan Hoobler 

Adventures in Odyssey – The Official Guide 2008 – Tyndale House Pub, 
Adventures in Odyssey – The Official Guide: 25th Birthday Edition 2012 – Tyndale House Pub,

Voice work
Adventures in Odyssey: Additional Voices

References

External links
 Nathan's AIOHQ Website 1999–2006
 Full list of works and credits

1979 births
Living people
American radio producers
American radio writers
Adventures in Odyssey